Jean-Paul-Preis is a Bavarian literary prize, awarded bi-annually by the Free State of Bavaria. It is named in honour of the German Romantic writer Jean Paul. The prize money is €15,000.

Recipients 

1983 Hans Egon Holthusen
1985 Friedrich Dürrenmatt
1987 Botho Strauß
1989 Horst Bienek
1991 Hermann Lenz
1993 Gertrud Fussenegger
1995 Siegfried Lenz
1997 Günter de Bruyn
1999 Herbert Rosendorfer
2001 Gerhard Polt
2003 Thomas Hürlimann
2005 Sarah Kirsch
2007 Uwe Dick
2009 Eckhard Henscheid
2011 Brigitte Kronauer
2013 Petra Morsbach
2015 Gerhard Roth
2017 Alexander Kluge
2019 Ursula Krechel
2021 Barbara Honigmann

References

External links
 

Literary awards of Bavaria